Leonard Nelson (11 July 1882 – 29 October 1927), sometimes spelt Leonhard, was a German mathematician, critical philosopher, and socialist. He was part of the neo-Friesian school (named after post-Kantian philosopher Jakob Friedrich Fries) of neo-Kantianism and a friend of the mathematician David Hilbert. He devised the Grelling–Nelson paradox in 1908 and the related idea of autological words with Kurt Grelling.

Nelson subsequently became influential in both philosophy and mathematics, as his close contacts with scientists and mathematicians influenced their ideas. Despite dying earlier than many of his friends and assistants, his ISK organization lived on after his death, even after being banned by the Nazi Regime in 1933. It is even claimed that Albert Einstein supported it. He's also credited with popularizing the Socratic method in his book Die sokratische Methode (The Socratic Method).

Life

Early life and education 
In Nelson's early years, he studied at Französisches Gymnasium Berlin where mathematics and science weren't notable in that school. He was therefore privately tutored by mathematician Gerhard Hessenberg (1874–1925), and began reading the works of philosophers Immanuel Kant, Jakob Friedrich Fries, and Ernst Friedrich Apelts, which began to spark his interest in philosophy.

In 1901, Nelson studied mathematics and philosophy at Heidelberg University for a short period of time before going to  Friedrich Wilhelm University (today: Humboldt-Universität) in Berlin from March 1901 – 1903. From 1903 to 1904, he worked with mathematicians and philosophers at the University of Göttingen, such as his doctoral advisor Julius Baumann, David Hilbert, Felix Klein, Carl Runge, and his later rival Edmund Husserl.

Critical philosophy 
Nelson's work as a philosopher was most concerned with critical philosophy, attributed to Kant. It sets out to find a "critique" on science and metaphysics, similar to empiricism, as things can only be true based on the perceptions and limitations on human minds. Kant's 1781 book Critique of Pure Reason (Kritik der reinen Vernunft) inspired Nelson to go down the path of critical philosophy, and later followed the works of post-Kantian philosopher Fries who had also followed Kant's work.

Although his 1904 dissertation Jakob Fries and his Latest Critics (Jakob Friedrich Fries und seine jüngsten Kritiker) was successful, he had trouble in his early academic years. One such failed dissertation was his Die kritische Methode und das Verhältnis der Psychologie zur Philosophie (The Critical Method and the Relationship of Psychology to Philosophy). Nelson continued defending Fries' philosophy and ideas by publishing a neue Folge (new series) of Abhandlungen der Fries'schen Schule (1904) with Gerhard Hessenberg and mathematician Karl Kaiser. It was here that Nelson and these same friends created the Jakob-Friedrich-Fries-Gesellschaft (Jakob Friedrich Fries Society) to promote critical philosophy.

In 1922, Nelson founded the Philosophisch-Politische Akademie (Philosophical-Political Academy or PPA) as a "Platonic Academy" and non-profit association, which was abandoned soon after the Nazis banned it, but re-established in 1949. It still stands today for political discussions between philosophers and politicians, and was supported financially by the Gesellschaft der Freunde der Philosophisch-Politischen Akademie (Society of Friends of the Philosophical-Political Academy or GFA). They started working with an education center called Landerziehungsheim Walkemühle, founded in 1921 by a support of Nelson, progressive teacher Ludwig Wunder (1878–1949). Although Wunder left it shortly after in 1924, educator and co-worker of Nelson, Minna Specht, took over, with the help of journalist and author Mary Saran.

Animal rights

Nelson was an early advocate of animal rights and a vegetarian. His lecture "Duties to Animals" was published posthumously in Germany in 1932 and included in his book A System of Ethics (translated in 1956) and reprinted in the book Animals, Men and Morals in 1972.

Career 
Ready to form new ideas, Nelson founded the Neo-Friesian School in 1903, with some well-known members, such as:

 Rudolf Otto, philosopher (1869–1937)
 Gerhard Hessenberg, mathematician (1874–1925)
 Otto Meyerhof, biochemist (1884–1951)

Other notable people, such as philosopher Kurt Grelling and mathematician Richard Courant (student of Hilbert), joined after its foundation. A larger list of ISK members and similar can be seen in the list of Germans who resisted Nazism. In 1909 he habilitated at the University of Göttingen and became Privatdozent there. He later worked there as a professor from June 1919 until his death on 29 October 1927.

Internationaler Sozialistischer Kampfbund (ISK) 
The Internationaler Jugendbund (International Youth Federation or IJB) was founded in 1917 by Nelson and Minna Specht. In 1918, Nelson became a brief member of the Independent Social Democratic Party (USPD) before becoming a member of the Social Democratic Party (SPD) from 1923–1925, when he was ultimately excluded. As a result, together with Minna Specht, he founded the Internationaler Sozialistischer Kampfbund (ISK; "International Socialist Militant League") in 1925, merging it with the IJB by taking over its publishing label, Öffentliches Leben.

The socialist journalist Willi Eichler succeeded Nelson as president of the ISK after his death. Eichler and Specht would both sign the 1932 "Urgent Call for Unity" (Dringender Appell für die Einheit) in the ISK's official newspaper, Der Funke. It called for Germany's Social Democratic Party (SPD) and Communist Party (KPD) to create a left-wing united front in order to thwart the Nazis. After the Nazis' defeat in 1945, the ISK was merged with the SPD with the agreement met on 10 December 1945, between the chairman of the ISK (Willi Eichler) and chairman of the SPD (Kurt Schumacher). However, the ISK continued to be active in the resistance against Nazism. A British affiliate of the ISK was created (lasted from the 1920s to the 1950s) in the United Kingdom called the Socialist Vanguard Group.

Among Leonard Nelson's students and political companions in the International Socialist Kampfbund were:

 SPD politician Willi Eichler (1896–1971)
 Prime Minister Alfred Kubel (1909–1999)
 Journalist Fritz Eberhard (1896–1982), later member of the Parlamentarischer Rat

Personal life 

Leonard Nelson was the son of lawyer Heinrich Nelson (1854–1929) and artist Elisabeth Lejeune Dirichlet (1860–1920), granddaughter of mathematician Peter Gustav Lejeune Dirichlet and descendant of Jewish philosopher Moses Mendelssohn. Nelson married his wife, Elisabeth Schemmann (1884–1954), in 1907, but divorced in 1912 after she baptised their son Gerhard David Wilhelm Nelson (1909–1944) in the Lutheran Church. Nelson's wife is notable for marrying Paul Hensel in 1917. His granddaughter, Maria Nelson, and Maria's daughter, Rachel Urban, both visited his grave in the summer of 1997.

Although Nelson was baptised as a Protestant at the age of five on 13 June 1887, his refusal to baptise his son and divorce was a big change based on his Jewish ancestry. He even resigned from the Evangelical Church in 1919.

Death 
He was an insomniac and died at a young age from pneumonia, and was buried at a Jewish cemetery in Melsungen alongside his father Heinrich. Nelson's ideas continued to have an impact upon German socialism and communism in Nazi Germany as the ISK's members became active in the left-wing resistance to Nazism.

Bibliography 
Nelson published numerous books and papers, often with the help of other philosophers and mathematicians. He was later critical of Georg Wilhelm Friedrich Hegel in his work Progress and Regress in Philosophy (Fortschritte und Rückschritte der Philosophie). He is also known for defending the idea of animal rights in his work System of Philosophical Ethics and Pedagogy (System der philosophischen Ethik und Pädagogik) published in 1932, with the help of his assistant Grete Hermann (also part of the ISK) and Minna Specht.

Some of his works are already mentioned above, but some others, available in the Internet Archive (and other websites, if not available there), include:

1908 – Ist metaphysikfreie Naturwissenschaft möglich? Sonderdruck aus den Abhandlungen der Fries’schen Schule, II. Bd., 3. Heft. Vandenhoeck & Ruprecht, Göttingen 1908 Internet Archive
1908 – Über das sogenannte Erkenntnisproblem. Vandenhoeck & Ruprecht, Göttingen 1908 Internet Archive
1908 – Über wissenschaftliche und ästhetische Naturbetrachtung. Vandenhoeck & Ruprecht, Göttingen 1908 Internet Archive
1915 – Ethische Methodenlehre, by Veit & Comp., Leipzig 1915 Internet Archive
1917 – Vorlesungen über die Grundlagen der Ethik. Veit & Comp., Leipzig
 Bd. 1: Kritik der praktischen Vernunft. 1917 Internet Archive
1917 – Die Rechtswissenschaft ohne Recht: kritische Betrachtungen über die Grundlagen des Staats- und Völkerrechts insbesondere über die Lehre von der Souveränität. Veit & Comp, Leipzig 1917 Internet Archive
1919 – Demokratie und Führerschaft, Public life, Berlin 1932. Internet Archive
1920 – System der philosophischen Rechtslehre. Verlag der Neue Geist / Reinhold, Leipzig 1920 Internet Archive
1922 – Die Reformation der Gesinnung: durch Erziehung zum Selbstvertrauen. The New Publishes, Leipzig 1922 Internet Archive
1922 – Die sokratische Methode, Lecture, held on December 11, 1922 in the Pedagogical Society in Göttingen. In: Treatises of the Friesian school. New episode. edited by Otto Meyerhof, Franz Oppenheimer, Minna Specht. 5th volume, Göttingen 1929, pp. 21–78. Internet Archive
2011 – , a series of lectures, delivered from April to July 1921 that was omitted from his collected works. English translation

Gesammelte Schriften in neun Bänden 
English translation: "Collected Writings in Nine Volumes". It was published by Paul Bernays and Felix Meiner Verlag (a German scientific publishing house in philosophy), in Hamburg 1970-1977;

 Volume I: Die Schule der kritischen Philosophie und ihre Methode
 Volume II: Geschichte und Kritik der Erkenntnistheorie
 Volume III: Die kritische Methode in ihrer Bedeutung für die Wissenschaft
 Volume IV: Kritik der praktischen Vernunft
 Volume V: System der philosophischen Ethik und Pädagogik
 Volume VI: System der philosophischen Rechtslehre und Politik
 Volume VII: Fortschritte und Rückschritte der Philosophie von Hume und Kant bis Hegel und Fries
 Volume VIII: Sittlichkeit und Bildung
 Volume IX: Recht und Staat

Published works 
 Ethische Methodenlehre. by Veit & Comp., Leipzig 1915
 Die Rechtswissenschaft ohne Recht. von Veit & Comp., Leipzig 1917.
 Die sokratische Methode. Vortrag, gehalten am 11. Dezember 1922 in der Pädagogischen Gesellschaft in Göttingen. In: Abhandlungen der Fries’schen Schule. Neue Folge.Hrsg. v. Otto Meyerhof, Franz Oppenheimer, Minna Specht. 5. Band, H. 1. Öffentliches Leben, Göttingen 1929, S. 21–78.
 Demokratie und Führerschaft. Öffentliches Leben, Berlin 1932.
 Ausgewählte Schriften. Studienausgabe. Hrsg. und eingeleitet von Heinz-Joachim Heydorn. Europäische Verlagsanstalt, Frankfurt 1974.
 Vom Selbstvertrauen der Vernunft: Schriften zur krit. Philosophie und ihrer Ethik. Hrsg. von Grete Henry-Hermann (Philosophische Bibliothek. Band 288). Meiner, Hamburg 1975.

References

External links

Biography from the SFCP site
A Theory of Philosophical Fallacies by Andrew Aberdein (in-depth review)
worldcat.org, Nelson, Leonard (1882-1927)
Der Funke newspaper, 12 July 1932 – Leonard Nelson's 50th anniversary (in German)
Newspaper by Judith Féaux de Lacroix, Melsunger edition of the Hessisch-Niedersächsische Allgemeine (28 November 2017) (in German)
"Walkemuehle -Schule des ISK". www.allerart.de (in German)

1882 births
1927 deaths
19th-century German Jews
20th-century German mathematicians
German animal rights scholars
German socialists
Jewish philosophers
Jewish socialists
Kantian philosophers
University of Göttingen alumni
Writers from Berlin
Deaths from pneumonia in Germany
Französisches Gymnasium Berlin alumni
20th-century German philosophers